Richard Nottingham Watts (February 3, 1873 – December 3, 1945) was an American football and baseball coach. He served as the fourth head football coach at Baylor University, coaching in 1903 and compiling a record of 4–3–1.  Ewing was also the second head baseball coach at Baylor, coaching from 1903 to 1904 and tallying a mark of 13–18. He was an alumnus of the Virginia Polytechnic Institute, where he had played football previously. He later worked for the United States Geological Survey.

Head coaching record

Football

References

External links
 

1873 births
1945 deaths
19th-century players of American football
American football ends
American football tackles
Austin Kangaroos football coaches
Baylor Bears athletic directors
Baylor Bears baseball coaches
Baylor Bears football coaches
Virginia Tech Hokies football players
People from Bowling Green, Virginia